Price is a village municipality in La Mitis Regional County Municipality in the Bas-Saint-Laurent region of Quebec, Canada.  Its population in the Canada 2021 Census was 1,729.

The city of Mont-Joli provides the services necessary for the whole region.

History 

It was the arrival of the Price Brothers and Company (of William Evan Price) that the village of Price was founded at the end of the 19th century.  It was a suburb of Saint-Octave-de-Métis, which constituted a community of workers, who were employed at the saw mill.

The parish of (Saint-Rémi-de-Métis) was detached from Saint-Octave-de-Métis in 1909.  In 1916, the parish was erected.  Ten years later, in 1926, the municipality was founded under the name Priceville.  The name was modified in 1945 to avoid confusion with the village of Princeville in the Bois-Francs region of Quebec.

A hydroelectric dam (Mitis I) was the first in the Bas-Saint-Laurent region after its construction in 1923, providing electricity to the Gaspésie region.

Demographics 

Economy 
The economic vitality of the community has always centred on the pulp and paper industry.  Since 1888, the saw mills have flourished on in Price.  Today, two industries are still present in the area, even though there is an economic crisis in the forest industry.  Bois d'oeuvre Cedrico and le Groupe Lebel, are the two compagnies involved.

Noted natives 
 Jean Lapointe (author-composer-interpreter, actor and Canadian Senator)

See also
 List of village municipalities in Quebec

References

External links
 

Villages in Quebec
Incorporated places in Bas-Saint-Laurent